Mizna is a nonprofit arts organization located in St. Paul, Minnesota. Founded in 1999, Mizna describes itself as “a critical platform for Arab and Southwest Asian and North African (SWANA) film, literature, and art.” Since 1999, Mizna has published a biannual literary journal, Mizna: Prose, Poetry and Art Exploring Arab America. Since 2003, Mizna has produced the Twin Cities Arab Film Festival (TCAFF), which became annual in 2013. Throughout its history, Mizna has organized and participated in a variety of arts and cultural programming, including visual art exhibitions, community workshops, drumming and Arabic classes, and local festivals such as Northern Sparks. In 2020, Mizna was named Best Nonprofit by City Pages.

History 
Mizna originated in 1996 as a section in a newsletter for the American Arab Anti-Discrimination Committee (ADC) in Minnesota, where Mizna co-founder Kathy Haddad served as president of the organization's local chapter. It initially contained news of interest to Arab Americans, but gradually began to include literary works. By 1998, Mizna was incorporated as a literary journal, co-edited by Haddad and Saleh Abudayyeh. The first issue of Mizna: Prose, Poetry and Art Exploring Arab America was published in January 1999.

Since 1999, Mizna has presented SWANA artists across a wide range of practices, including electronic musician Hello Psychaleppo, poets Suheir Hammad and Khaled Mattawa, visual artist Fadlabi, filmmaker Annemarie Jacir, and author Randa Jarrar. In 2003 Mizna presented the first Twin Cities Arab American Film Festival (TCAFF). The annual festival showcases films by Arab filmmakers from Southwest Asia and North Africa as well as the diaspora.

In September 2019, Mizna presented their first major visual arts exhibition, History Is Not Here: Art and the Arab Imaginary, featuring the work of 17 SWANA artists who had been presented in Mizna's literary and culture journal, including Monira al-Qadiri, Emily Jacir, Alaa Satir, Fadlabi, and the artist duo Basel Abbas and Ruanne Abou-Rahme. Held at the Minnesota Museum of American Art, History Is Not Here was curated by Heba Y. Amin and Maymanah Farhat and Mizna's visual art curator Heba Y. Amin. Mizna received support from the Warhol Foundation for this exhibition.

Mizna: Prose, Poetry and Art Exploring Arab America 
The first issue of Mizna: Prose, Poetry and Art Exploring Arab America was published in January 1999. A biannual publication, Mizna has published 38 issues over 21 years as of 2021.

Over the years, more than 400 writers have been published in Mizna. Contributors include Suheir Hammad, Mahmoud Darwish, Eileen Myles, Naomi Shihab Nye, Laila Lalami, Hisham Matar, Abdifatah Shafat, Sahar Mustafah, Najla Said, Ismail Khalidi, Matthew Shenoda, Zeyn Joukhadar, Ramla Bile, Hazem Fahmy, Joe Kadi, Khaled Mattawa, Robert Farid Karimi and Omar Sakr.

In 2019, Mizna celebrated its 20-year anniversary and published a special issue entitled “Twenty Years” that included many authors who had been published in the first year of publication.

In 2021, Mizna won the CLMP Firecracker Award for Magazines.

Twin Cities Arab Film Festival 
Mizna's Twin Cities Arab Film Festival (TCAFF) was launched in 2003, with the aim of showcasing the contemporary cinema of the Arab and Arab diasporic world from emerging, independent, and established filmmakers. A major goal of the TCAFF is to provide a space for films that reflect the Arab and Arab American community in all its complexity, and not in the simplistic and stereotyped ways they are often represented in mainstream Western film and media. Each year, the TCAFF screens curated narrative and documentary features, as well as a selection of curated short films. Mizna has presented many first screenings of films in Minnesota via TCAFF, and occasionally national premieres. The film festival format includes post-viewing audience discussions led by invited film artists, which serve to directly engage the audience in the artistry and ideas of screened films. From 2005 to 2013, the film festival was held at The Heights theatre in Columbia Heights, Minnesota. Since 2014, it has been held at St Anthony Main Theater in Minneapolis in collaboration with the Minneapolis St. Paul Film Society. In December 2020, Mizna presented the first fully online Arab Film Fest Collab (AFFC) in collaboration with the Arab American National Museum (AANM), the Arab Film and Media Institute (AFMI), and ArteEast.

Funding & Awards 
Mizna was named a Regional Cultural Treasure in 2021 by the Ford Foundation and McKnight Foundation and is the recipient of several cultural awards, including multiple Knight Arts Challenge Awards, the Ordway's Sally Award for Social Impact (2018), and Best Nonprofit in Citypages’ Best of the Twin Cities (2020). Funders and supporters of Mizna include the Academy of Motion Picture Arts and Sciences, McKnight Foundation, St. Paul Cultural STAR Program, National Endowment for the Arts, Minnesota State Arts Board, Metropolitan Regional Arts Council, Center for Arab American Philanthropy, National Network for Arab American Communities, and Knight Foundation.

References 

Arts organizations
Arab-American culture
Non-profit organizations based in Minnesota